Samsudin bin Osman (born 3 March 1947) is a Malaysian former public servant who served the Malaysian Government from 1969 to 2006. His last office in the public service was Chief Secretary to the Government from 1 February 2001 to 2 September 2006. He is currently the President of the International Islamic University Malaysia, and Chairman of the Employees Provident Fund.

Prior to being Chief Secretary, Samsudin was the secretary-general for the Ministry of Domestic Trade and Consumer Affairs from 1994 and the Ministry of Home Affairs from 1996.

He obtained his Bachelor of Arts (Hons) from the University of Malaya and Master of Public Administration from Pennsylvania State University. He is also a former student of the renowned English College Johore Bahru and Royal Military College, Sungai Besi.

Honours

Honours of Malaysia
  :
  Member of the Order of the Defender of the Realm (AMN) (1979)
  Companion of the Order of Loyalty to the Crown of Malaysia (JSM) (1992)
  Commander of the Order of Loyalty to the Crown of Malaysia (PSM) – Tan Sri (1999)
  Commander of the Order of the Defender of the Realm (PMN) – Tan Sri (2001)
  :
  Commander of the Order of Kinabalu (PGDK) – Datuk (1992)
  Grand Commander of the Order of Kinabalu (SPDK) – Datuk Seri Panglima (2001)
  :
  Knight Commander of the Order of the Crown of Selangor (DPMS) – Dato' (1999)
  Knight Grand Commander of the Order of the Crown of Selangor (SPMS) – Dato' Seri (2003)
  :
  Commander of the Order of the Perak State Crown (PMP) (1988)
  Knight Grand Commander of the Order of the Perak State Crown (SPMP) – Dato' Seri (2000)
 :
 Grand Knight of the Order of Sultan Ahmad Shah of Pahang (SSAP) - Dato’ Sri (2001)
  :
  Knight Commander of the Order of the Crown of Johor (DPMJ) – Dato' (2001)
  :
  Grand Commander of the Exalted Order of Malacca (DGSM) – Datuk Seri (2002)
  :
  Knight Grand Commander of the Order of the Life of the Crown of Kelantan (SJMK) – Dato' (2003)
  :
  Knight Commander of the Most Exalted Order of the Star of Sarawak (PNBS) – Dato Sri (2003)
  :
  Knight Commander of the Order of the Defender of State (DPPN) – Dato' Seri (2004)
  :
  Knight Commander of the Order of Loyalty to Sultan Abdul Halim Mu'adzam Shah (DHMS) – Dato' Paduka (2007)
  :
  Grand Commander of the Order of the Territorial Crown (SMW) – Datuk Seri (2008)
  Grand Knight of the Order of the Territorial Crown (SUMW) – Datuk Seri Utama (2018)

References 
  

1947 births
Living people
Malaysian politicians
People from Johor Bahru
Knights Commander of the Most Exalted Order of the Star of Sarawak
Malaysian people of Malay descent
Pennsylvania State University alumni
Malaysian Muslims
Commanders of the Order of Kinabalu
University of Malaya alumni
Chief Secretaries to the Government of Malaysia
Members of the Order of the Defender of the Realm
Companions of the Order of Loyalty to the Crown of Malaysia
Commanders of the Order of Loyalty to the Crown of Malaysia
Commanders of the Order of the Defender of the Realm
Grand Commanders of the Order of Kinabalu
Knights Commander of the Order of the Crown of Johor
Knights Grand Commander of the Order of the Crown of Selangor
Knights Commander of the Order of the Crown of Selangor